Qiu Yanan (born ) is a Chinese female volleyball player. She was part of the China women's national volleyball team.

She participated in the 2012 FIVB Volleyball World Grand Prix.

References

External links
 Profile at FIVB.org

1989 births
Living people
Chinese women's volleyball players
Place of birth missing (living people)
Opposite hitters
Outside hitters
21st-century Chinese women